Spirembolus is a genus of North American sheet weavers that was first described by Ralph Vary Chamberlin in 1920.

Species
 it contains forty-one species, found in Mexico, Canada, and the United States:
Spirembolus abnormis Millidge, 1980 – USA, Canada
Spirembolus approximatus (Chamberlin, 1949) – USA
Spirembolus bilobatus (Chamberlin & Ivie, 1945) – USA
Spirembolus cheronus Chamberlin, 1949 – USA
Spirembolus chilkatensis (Chamberlin & Ivie, 1947) – USA
Spirembolus demonologicus (Crosby, 1925) – USA
Spirembolus dispar Millidge, 1980 – USA
Spirembolus elevatus Millidge, 1980 – USA
Spirembolus erratus Millidge, 1980 – USA
Spirembolus falcatus Millidge, 1980 – USA
Spirembolus fasciatus (Banks, 1904) – USA
Spirembolus fuscus Millidge, 1980 – USA
Spirembolus hibernus Millidge, 1980 – USA
Spirembolus humilis Millidge, 1980 – USA
Spirembolus latebricola Millidge, 1980 – USA
Spirembolus levis Millidge, 1980 – USA, Mexico
Spirembolus maderus Chamberlin, 1949 – USA
Spirembolus mendax Millidge, 1980 – USA
Spirembolus mirus Millidge, 1980 – USA
Spirembolus monicus (Chamberlin, 1949) – USA
Spirembolus monticolens (Chamberlin, 1919) (type) – USA, Canada
Spirembolus montivagus Millidge, 1980 – USA
Spirembolus mundus Chamberlin & Ivie, 1933 – USA, Canada
Spirembolus novellus Millidge, 1980 – USA
Spirembolus oreinoides Chamberlin, 1949 – USA, Canada
Spirembolus pachygnathus Chamberlin & Ivie, 1935 – USA
Spirembolus pallidus Chamberlin & Ivie, 1935 – USA
Spirembolus perjucundus Crosby, 1925 – USA
Spirembolus phylax Chamberlin & Ivie, 1935 – USA
Spirembolus praelongus Millidge, 1980 – USA
Spirembolus prominens Millidge, 1980 – USA, Canada
Spirembolus proximus Millidge, 1980 – USA
Spirembolus pusillus Millidge, 1980 – USA
Spirembolus redondo (Chamberlin & Ivie, 1945) – USA
Spirembolus spirotubus (Banks, 1895) – USA, Canada
Spirembolus synopticus Crosby, 1925 – USA
Spirembolus tiogensis Millidge, 1980 – USA
Spirembolus tortuosus (Crosby, 1925) – USA
Spirembolus vallicolens Chamberlin, 1920 – USA
Spirembolus venustus Millidge, 1980 – USA
Spirembolus whitneyanus Chamberlin & Ivie, 1935 – USA

See also
 List of Linyphiidae species (Q–Z)

References

Araneomorphae genera
Linyphiidae
Spiders of North America